The Roaring Lion River is a river in the Buller District of New Zealand's South Island located in Kahurangi National Park.

See also
List of rivers of New Zealand

References

Rivers of the West Coast, New Zealand
Kahurangi National Park
Rivers of New Zealand